Abdullah Al-Oraimi (Arabic:عبد الله العريمي) (born 24 September 1991) is a Qatari footballer who plays as a midfielder.

External links
 

Omani footballers
Qatari footballers
1991 births
Living people
Sur SC players
Al-Arabi SC (Qatar) players
Qatar SC players
Al-Khor SC players
Naturalised citizens of Qatar
Qatar Stars League players
Association football midfielders
Footballers at the 2010 Asian Games
Asian Games competitors for Qatar